Ghassemi is a Persian/Iranian surname, derived from the given name "Ghasem" or "Ghassem". Other variations include "Ghasemi" and "Qasemi". It is especially common in Iran, United States and Great Britain. There are currently more than 2500 people with the last name "Ghassemi" living in the United States.  

Notable people with the surname include:

 Abbas Ghasemi, Iranian footballer
 Amir Ali Ghassemi, Iranian artist
 Mehran Ghassemi, Iranian journalist
 Reza Ghassemi, Iranian writer
 Rubic Ghasemi-Nobakht, Iranian footballer
 Sebastian Ghasemi-Nobakht, German footballer
 Komeil Ghasemi, Iranian Wrestler and Olympic Medallist

See Also
Mirza Ghassemi

References

Iranian-language surnames
Persian-language surnames